The Aero A.34 Kos (Czech: "Blackbird") was a small sports and touring biplane built in Czechoslovakia in the 1930s.

It was designed in 1929. The design was similar to the De Havilland Gipsy Moth. Of conventional biplane configuration and wooden construction, it featured wings that could be folded to allow it to be towed to and from airfields by automobile (width 2.91 m).

A prototype (registration L-BASO) had an 85 hp Walter Vega radial engine. It took part in the Challenge 1929 international contest (piloted by Josef Novak), but had to withdraw due to engine failure and crash-landing on August 8, 1929.

Seven A.34s and its variants were built by Aero, with different engines: three A.34Js had the Walter Junior engine, and three A.134s had the 100 hp Walter Venus. They were used as trainers and sports planes in Czechoslovak civilian and military aviation.

Variants
 A.34
 A.34J
 A.34W : Three aircraft powered by the 105 hp (78 kW) Walter Junior inline piston engine.
 A.134 : One prototype powered by the 130 hp (97 kW) Walter NZ 85 radial piston engine.

Specifications (A.34)

See also

References

1920s Czechoslovakian civil utility aircraft
1920s Czechoslovakian sport aircraft
Single-engined tractor aircraft
A034
Biplanes
Aircraft first flown in 1929